The Bond is a 2021 Chinese drama television series based on Wei Xi's novel of the same name, directed by Zhang Kaizhou and starring Bai Yu, Zhang Wanyi, Mao Xiaotong, Song Zu'er and Zhou Yiran. The series airs on Zhejiang TV, Jiangsu TV and Tencent Video from August  17 to September 8, 2021. The series received mainly positive reviews, Douban gave the drama 7.7 out of 10.

Plot
The story highlights the strong bond the five Qiao siblings have with each other after their mother's death, leaving them alone with their selfish father. Life may take each of us in different directions, but the bond forged by the hardships all five siblings endured continues to be strong. Through more than 30 years of development and social change, the five children of the Qiao family: Yicheng, Erqiang, Sanli, Simei and Qiqi, have always supported and relied on each other during difficult times.

Cast

Main 
Bai Yu as Qiao Yicheng
Huang Yi as Qiao Yicheng (teen)
Guo Ziming as Qiao Yicheng (young) 
Zhang Wanyi as Qiao Erqiang
Liang Jiatong as Qiao Erqiang (teen) 
Zhang Yuxuan as Qiao Erqiang (young)
Mao Xiaotong as Qiao Sanli
Chen Qianhua as Qiao Sanli (teen)
Lin Ruoxi as Qiao Sanli (young)
Li Luoyi as Qiao Sanli (child)
Song Zu'er as Qiao Simei 
Sun Menghan as Qiao Simei (teen) 
Zhang Xiwei as Qiao Simei (young)
Su Yike as Qiao Simei (child) 
Zhou Yiran as Qiao Qiqi
Zhang Bowen as Qiao Qiqi (young)

Supporting 
Liu Jun as Qiao Zuwang 
Tang Yixin as Xiang Nanfang
Li Jiahang as Qi Weimin 
Lu Zihang as Qi Weimin (teen)
Liu Kunlong as Qi Weimin (young) 
Zhu Zhu as Ma Qinqin 
Liu Lin as Wei Shufang 
Zhang Jianing as Chang Xingyu
Zhou Fang as Ye Xiaolang 
Qu Zheming as Wang Yiding 
Hou Wenyuan as Qi Chenggang 
Sun Anke as Sun Xiaorong
Sun Yihan as Wen Ju'an 
Chang Long as Song Qingyuan
Wang Yueyi as Yang Lingzi 
Xu Xiaohan as Liu Xiaomeng
Zhu Yongteng as Qi Zhiqiang
Juan Zi as Mother Xiang 
Feng Hui as Chief Shi
Wu Qijiang as Uncle Shen
Xu Baihui as Aunt Fu 
Cui Yi as Aunt Wu 
Wang Lan as Qu Aying 
Guo Ge as Wei Shuying 
Wang Yajun as Yi Ding's mother 
Liang Wenhui as Meng Guizhi 
Li Hongchen as Xiang Beifang

Ratings 

 Highest ratings are marked in red, lowest ratings are marked in blue

Soundtrack

Awards and nominations

Broadcast

References

External links

2021 Chinese television series debuts
2021 Chinese television series endings
Chinese drama television series
Television shows based on Chinese novels
Mandarin-language television shows
Chinese television series
Television series by Daylight Entertainment
Guangdong Television original programming
Shandong Television original programming
Tencent original programming